The Edmunds–Tucker Act of 1887 was an Act of Congress that focused on restricting some practices of the Church of Jesus Christ of Latter-day Saints (LDS Church). An amendment to the earlier Edmunds Act, it was passed in response to the dispute between the United States Congress and the LDS Church regarding polygamy. The act is found in US Code Title 48 & 1461, full text as 24 Stat. 635, with this annotation to be interpreted as Volume 24, page 635 of United States Statutes at Large. The act is named after its congressional sponsors, Senator George F. Edmunds of Vermont and Congressman John Randolph Tucker of Virginia. 

The act was repealed in 1978.

Legislative history
In President Grover Cleveland's annual address to Congress in December 1885, he emotionally discussed the issue of polygamy in Utah:

The strength, the perpetuity, and the destiny of the nation rest upon our homes, established by the law of God, guarded by parental care, regulated by parental authority, and sanctified by parental love.

These are not the homes of polygamy. . . .

There is no feature of this practice or the system which sanctions it which is not opposed to all that is of value in our institutions.

There should be no relaxation in the firm but just execution of the law now in operation, and I should be glad to approve such further discreet legislation as will rid the country of this blot upon its fair fame.

Since the people upholding polygamy in our Territories are reenforced by immigration from other lands, I recommend that a law be passed to prevent the importation of Mormons into the country.M. Paul Holsinger, "Henry M. Teller and the Edmunds-Tucker Act". The Colorado Magazine, vol 48 no 1, Winter 1971, p. 3. http://www.historycolorado.org/sites/default/files/files/Researchers/ColoradoMagazine_v48n1_Winter1971.pdf  

The Act was passed by the Senate in January 1886 by a vote of 38–7. It was passed by the House via a voice vote in January 1887.  President Cleveland refused to sign the bill but did not veto it, which meant that the Act became law on March 3, 1887.

Provisions
The act disincorporated both the LDS Church and the Perpetual Emigration Fund on the grounds that they fostered polygamy. The act prohibited the practice of polygamy and punished it with a fine of from $500 to $800 and imprisonment of up to five years. It dissolved the corporation of the church and directed the confiscation by the federal government of all church properties valued over a limit of $50,000. The act was enforced by the U.S. Marshal and a host of deputies. 

The act:
Disincorporated the LDS Church and the Perpetual Emigrating Fund Company, with assets to be used for public schools in the Territory.
Required an anti-polygamy oath for prospective voters, jurors and public officials.
Annulled territorial laws allowing illegitimate children to inherit.
Required civil marriage licenses (to aid in the prosecution of polygamy).
Abrogated the common law spousal privilege for polygamists, thus requiring wives to testify against their husbands.
Disenfranchised women (who had been enfranchised by the Territorial legislature in 1870).
 Replaced local judges (including the previously powerful Probate Court judges) with federally appointed judges.
 Abolished the office of Territorial superintendent of district schools, granting the supreme court of the Territory of Utah the right to appoint a commissioner of schools.  Also called for the prohibition of the use of sectarian books and for the collection of statistics of the number of so-called gentiles and Mormons attending and teaching in the schools.

(See text of the act scanned from the U.S. Statutes at large, linked elsewhere on this page.)

In 1890 the U.S. Supreme Court upheld the seizure of Church property under the Edmunds–Tucker Act in Late Corp. of the Church of Jesus Christ of Latter-Day Saints v. United States.

This act was repealed in 1978.

Edmunds–Tucker Act sponsors

See also

1890 Manifesto
The Church of Jesus Christ of Latter-day Saints and politics in the United States
Edmunds Act (1882)
Timeline of civil marriage in the United States
LDS Church v. United States (1890)
Morrill Anti-Bigamy Act (1862)
Poland Act (1874)
Reynolds v. United States (1879)
Second Manifesto (1904)
Smoot Hearings (1903–1907)
Utah War (1857–1858)
Women's suffrage in Utah

References

Further reading
 
 
 
 

1887 in American law
1887 in Christianity
49th United States Congress
History of the Church of Jesus Christ of Latter-day Saints
United States law and polygamy in Mormonism
The Church of Jesus Christ of Latter-day Saints in the United States
United States federal territory and statehood legislation
Repealed United States legislation
Utah Territory
19th-century Mormonism
United States legislation about religion
Christianity and law in the 19th century
Utah suffrage